Ramona Falls may refer to:

 Ramona Falls (Oregon), a waterfall on the upper Sandy River on Mount Hood
 Ramona Falls (band), a musical group formed in 2009